Albert Maria Forster (26 July 1902 – 28 February 1952) was a Nazi German politician, member of the SS and war criminal. Under his administration as the Gauleiter and Reichsstatthalter of Danzig-West Prussia  (the other German-annexed section of occupied Poland aside from the Warthegau) during the Second World War, the local non-German population of Poles and Jews was classified as sub-human and subjected to extermination campaign involving ethnic cleansing, mass murder, and in the case of some Poles with German ancestry, forceful Germanisation. Forster was directly responsible for the extermination of non-Germans and was a strong supporter of Polish genocide, which he had advocated before the war. Forster was tried, convicted and hanged in Warsaw for his crimes, after Germany was defeated.

Early life
Forster was born in Fürth, Bavaria, where he attended the Humanistisches Gymnasium from 1912 to 1920. In 1923, he became a member of the SA in Fürth and observed the trial for high treason of Erich Ludendorff, Adolf Hitler and eight others, which took place between 26 February and 1 April 1924 in the court of Munich.

Nazi Party

Free City of Danzig

On 15 October 1930, Forster became the Nazi Party's Gauleiter of the Free City of Danzig (now Gdańsk, Poland). In the spring of 1933, Forster spearheaded the Nazi take-over of Danzig. Between 1933 and 1939, Forster became embroiled in a feud with the Nazi President of the Danzig Senate, Arthur Greiser, who was to remain Forster's lifelong nemesis.

Before World War II, Forster had tried and failed to gain control over the organisation of the irredentist activities of the ethnic German population in the Polish Corridor, neighbouring Freie Stadt Danzig, which was created in 1920 by the Treaty of Versailles; rather it was the SS-dominated Volksdeutsche Mittelstelle that won control. With Forster and Himmler engaged in a power struggle, this rendered the (ethnic) Germans suspicious of Forster. When these territories were annexed after the Invasion of Poland and they became Reichsgau Danzig – West Prussia, Forster's distrust of the local Nazi leaders led him to deny them political power. Forster filled all the significant positions with his allies from the pre-war Free City of Danzig. This snub created a great bitterness among the local Germans in addition to Forster's Germanisation policies, which denied them a higher status than local Poles.

In May 1934 Forster, who had been made an Honorary Citizen of Fürth and of Danzig, married Gertrud Deetz. The wedding took place in the Berlin chancellory, with Hitler and Rudolf Hess as witnesses and wedding guests. However, a 1943-44 report on Hitler titled Analysis of the Personality of Adolph Hitler by psychoanalyst Walter C. Langer asserts that Forster "is known to be a homosexual" and was often addressed as "Bubi," a common term of affection among German homosexuals of the era.

In 1937 Forster boasted about his fight against communists and other "subhumans".

In 1939, following orders from Berlin, Forster led the agitation in Danzig to step up pressure for annexation by Nazi Germany and proclaimed that in future "Poland will be only a dream". On 23 August Forster replaced Greiser as Danzig's head of state. The Danzig issue was one of the pretexts used for the Nazi invasion of Poland in 1939. He was hateful of Jews whom he called "dirty and slippery race" and he expressed his desire to control parts of Poland after Poles would be expelled from them.

World War II
Immediately following the German invasion of Poland, Forster on 8 September was appointed Chief of Civil Administration in the military district of Danzig-West Prussia, which subsequently was annexed to the German Reich on 8 October 1939. The military administration ended and he was then appointed Gauleiter of the newly created Reichsgau Danzig-West Prussia on 21 October. At the same time, he was also named Reichsstatthalter (Reich Governor) of the new territory, thereby uniting under his control the highest party and governmental offices in his jurisdiction. Additionally, he was appointed Reich Defense Commissioner of the newly established Wehrkreis (Military District) XX, consisting of the new Reichsgau. He would retain these posts until fleeing Danzig on 27 March 1945 ahead of the invading Soviet forces.  On  7 July 1940 he was elected to the Reichstag for Danzig-West Prussia and would remain a member until the end of the Nazi regime. A member of the SS since 1926, Forster was promoted to SS-Obergruppenführer on 31 December 1941. 

Adolf Hitler instructed the Gauleiters, namely Forster and his rival Arthur Greiser, Gauleiter in the Warthegau, to Germanise the area, promising that "There would be no questions asked" about how this "Germanisation" was to be accomplished. Forster's goal was to make the area fully Germanised within ten years, and he was directly responsible for extermination policy in the region.

Extermination and ethnic cleansing
Forster was directly responsible for the extermination of non-Germans in Danzig-West Prussia. He personally believed in the need to engage in genocide of Poles and stated that, "We have to exterminate this nation, starting from the cradle" and declared that Poles and Jews were not human.

Around 70 camps were set up for Polish people in Pomerania where they were subjected to murder, torture and, in the case of women and girls, rape before being executed. Between the 10th and 15th of September, Forster organised a meeting of top Nazi officials in his region and ordered the immediate removal of all "dangerous" Poles, all Jews, and all Polish clergy. In some cases Forster ordered executions himself. On the 19th of October he reprimanded Nazi officials in the city of Grudziadz for not "spilling enough Polish blood."
 		 	
The total number of victims of what Christopher Browning calls an "orgy of murder and deportation" cannot be precisely estimated. Forster reported that 87,000 people had been "evacuated" from the region by February 1940.

Piaśnica

Forster was one of those responsible for the mass murders in Piaśnica, where approximately 12,000 to 16,000 Poles, Jews, Czechs and even Germans were killed in the winter of 1939-1940. 
Forster personally encouraged such violence; in a speech at the Prusinski Hotel in Wejherowo he incited ethnic Germans to attack Poles by saying "We have to eliminate the lice-ridden Poles, starting with those in the cradle. In your hands I give the fate of the Poles; you can do with them what you want". The crowd gathered before the hotel chanted "Kill the Polish dogs!" and "Death to the Poles". The Selbstschutz later participated in the massacres as Piaśnica. In 1946 a Polish National Tribunal in Gdańsk held Forster responsible for the murders at Piasnica.

Role in the Jewish Holocaust
Forster at the outbreak of the war declared that "Jews are not humans, and must be eradicated like vermin...mercy towards Jews is reprehensible. Any means of destruction of Jews is desirable." Jews were killed locally or deported to the General Government. By November 1939 Danzig-West Prussia was declared "Judenfrei". It is estimated that up to 30,000 Jews from Polish areas annexed by Nazi Germany in Pomerania and attached to Danzig-West Prussia were murdered during the war.

Germanisation policies

The Nazi policy and terror instituted by Forster offered only two possibilities to the Polish population: extermination or Germanisation.
Forster pursued a policy of genocide and forced assimilation of the population in his area of responsibility. At the start of the war Forster planned ethnic cleansing of all Poles originating from Congress Poland and all Jews by February 1940 from his Gau, but unforeseen problems with agriculture workers and the inadequate character of German settlers forced him to revise his policies. Forster was willing to accept any and all Poles who claimed to have "German blood" as Germans. In practice, the method of determining whether Poles had any German ancestry or not was to send out Nazi Party workers to interview the local Poles; all Poles who stated that they had German ancestry had their answers taken at face value with no documentation required. Refusal to become Germanised was punishable by deportation to the General Government or imprisonment in a concentration camp. In some cases whole settlements were classed as populated by Germans in order to meet quotas Forster laid down. Practical issues like food production could influence Forster's decisions on whom to expel.

Forster was at odds with Arthur Greiser, who had complained to Heinrich Himmler, the 'Reich Commissioner for the Strengthening of Germandom', that Forster's assimilation policy was against Nazi racial theory. When Himmler approached Forster over this issue, Forster simply ignored him, realizing that Hitler allowed each Gauleiter to run his area as he saw fit. Both Greiser and Himmler complained to Hitler that Forster was allowing thousands of Poles to be classified as Germans, but Hitler merely bounced the problem back to them, telling them to go sort out their problems with Forster on their own. This was a difficult task; Himmler's attempts to cajole Forster to see matters his way met with resentment and contempt. In a discussion with Richard Hildebrandt Forster scoffed, "if I looked like Himmler, I wouldn't talk about race".

The outcome of these policies was that two-thirds of the ethnic Polish population of Forster's Gau would be classed as German under the Deutsche Volksliste.

Although far fewer Poles would be removed from Danzig-West Prussia than in the neighbouring Warthegau it is estimated that by the end of the war, up to 60,000 people had been murdered in the region and up to 170,000 expelled. Other estimates place the expulsion figure at around 35,000 people. Forster himself reported that 87,000 people had been "evacuated" from the region by February 1940.

Conflict with SS and colonisation policies
Forster's conflict with the SS also had direct and injurious consequences for ethnic Germans. During the war, hundreds of thousands of ethnic Germans were moved by Nazi-Soviet agreement from the Soviet Union into Poland and used as colonists in Nazi occupied Poland. While Greiser did all he could to accommodate them in his Reichsgau, Forster viewed them with hostility, claiming that his region needed young farmers while the refugees were old and urbanised. He initially refused to admit any of them into his Reichsgau. When a ship bearing several thousands of ethnic Germans from the Baltic states arrived at Danzig he initially refused them entry unless Himmler promised that they would not be settled in Danzig-West Prussia but proceed immediately elsewhere, an assurance that Himmler could not provide. It was only following a lengthy telephone consultation with the desperate Himmler that Forster allowed the passengers to disembark, on the understanding that their residence in the Reichsgau would be temporary, though most did not, ultimately, leave the region. In time he had to relent, and by June 1944, 53,258 colonists had settled in Danzig-West Prussia, a far cry from the 421,780 settled in the Warthegau. Forster's Germanization policies left less free land and housing than Greiser's mass expulsions, although it is evident that Forster's perception of the ethnic German refugees as wards of the SS played its role in determining his attitude.

Trial and death
At the end of the war, Forster took refuge in the British Occupation Zone of Germany. The British handed him over to the People's Republic of Poland. 

In 1948, Forster was condemned to death by the Polish court for war crimes (the Supreme National Tribunal) and crimes against humanity. He was held and had his sentence deferred. The Polish president denied clemency on 21 February 1952 and Forster was moved from Gdańsk to Mokotów Prison in Warsaw, where he was hanged on 28 February 1952. His wife, who had not heard from him since 1949, was informed of his death in 1954.

See also

List SS-Obergruppenführer

References
Notes

Bibliography
Levine, Herbert S. (1969)  "Local Authority and the SS State: The Conflict over Population Policy in Danzig-West Prussia, 1939-1945" in Central European History 2#2 pp. 331–355
McNamara, Paul (2009) Sean Lester, Poland, and the Nazi Takeover of Danzig Dublin and Portland, Oregon: Irish Academic Press.
Miller, Michael D. and Schulz, Andreas (2012) Gauleiter: The Regional Leaders Of The Nazi Party And Their Deputies, 1925-1945 (Volume 1:  Herbert Albrecht to H. Wilhelm Huttmann) R. James Bender Publishing. 
Rees, Laurence (1997) The Nazis: A Warning From History'' New York: New Press.

External links
 

1902 births
1952 deaths
People from Fürth
People from the Kingdom of Bavaria
Nazi Party politicians
Members of the Reichstag of the Weimar Republic
Members of the Reichstag of Nazi Germany
SS-Obergruppenführer
Sturmabteilung personnel
Executed heads of state
Executed people from Bavaria
Nazi Party officials
Gauleiters
Reichsgau Danzig-West Prussia
German people convicted of crimes against humanity
Prisoners and detainees of the British military
Executions by the Supreme National Tribunal
Holocaust perpetrators in Poland
People extradited to Poland
Executed mass murderers